Blodnik is a small dispersed settlement east of Trojane in central Slovenia. It lies within the Municipality of Zagorje ob Savi. The area is part of the traditional region of Upper Carniola. It is now included with the rest of the municipality in the Central Sava Statistical Region.

Name
Blodnik was attested in written sources as Vbludnizi in 1571.

References

External links

Blodnik on Geopedia

Populated places in the Municipality of Zagorje ob Savi